Hope & Gloria is an American sitcom television series created by Bill and Cheri Steinkellner, that aired on NBC from March 9, 1995, through June 22, 1996. The show was canceled after 35 episodes. It starred Cynthia Stevenson as Hope, a high-strung television producer, and Jessica Lundy as Gloria, a tough-talking beautician, who become neighbors in an apartment complex in downtown Pittsburgh. The program also starred Alan Thicke as a local TV personality and featured Enrico Colantoni in one of his first regular roles on television.

The series was broadcast in Britain on ITV during the 1996 summer holiday, going out Monday to Friday for seven weeks.

Cast
Jessica Lundy.....Gloria Utz
Cynthia Stevenson.....Hope Davidson
Enrico Colantoni.....Louis Utz
Alan Thicke.....Dennis Dupree
Robert Garrova.....Sonny Utz
Taylor Negron as Gwillem Blatt (season 2)

Episodes

Season 1 (1995)

Season 2 (1995–96)

Notable guest stars
Larry Poindexter as Jeffrey
Lisa Kudrow as Phoebe Buffay

External links
 
 

1990s American sitcoms
1995 American television series debuts
1996 American television series endings
NBC original programming
Television duos
Television series by Warner Bros. Television Studios
Television shows set in Pittsburgh
English-language television shows